Twashta Kasar (also known as Tambat or Kasar) is a Hindu artisan caste of coppersmiths (tamrakar and tamta), predominantly residing in the Indian state of Maharashtra. In Goa, they call themselves Twashta Kasar Brahmin. According to Herbert Hope Risley, they are a branch of the Suvarna Banik, who became degraded because they took to working in metal.

They are included in the Other Backward Class category by the Government of Maharashtra.

Traditions 
The primary religion of Twashta Kasar is Hindu. The community worships Kalika as a guardian deity (Palak Devta). They have established "Twashta Kasar Samaj Samstha Kalika Mandir" in every city wherever they have a sizable population. The Samaj Samstha is a community center where they organize events. In Pune, the community has been celebrating Ganeshotsav since 1893.

Although Kokani is their mother tongue, most of them converse in marathi. Traditionally, they are non-vegetarian.

References 

Indian surnames
Social groups of Maharashtra